AG Insurance–Soudal–Quick-Step is a Belgian women's road bicycle racing team which participates in elite women's races. The team was established in 2019.

Team roster

Major results
2021
Stage 2a Baloise Ladies Tour, Charlotte Kool
 U23 Time Trial Championships, Shari Bossuyt
Stage 2 (ITT) Watersley Womens Challenge, Shari Bossuyt
Grand Prix d'Isbergues, Charlotte Kool
2022
 U23 Time Trial Championships, Britt Knaven
Grand Prix du Morbihan Féminin, Ally Wollaston
Stage 1 Belgium Tour, Ally Wollaston
Stage 2 Watersley Womens Challenge, Maud Rijnbeek

Continental & national champions
2022
 New Zealand Criterium, Ally Wollaston
 Netherlands Track (Omnium), Mylène De Zoete
 Oceania Track (Team Pursuit), Ally Wollaston
 Oceania Track (Madison), Ally Wollaston
 Oceania Track (Scratch Race), Ally Wollaston
 Belgium U23 Time Trial, Britt Knaven
2023
 New Zealand Criterium, Ally Wollaston

References

External links

UCI Women's Teams
Cycling teams based in Belgium
Cycling teams established in 2019